Pan Dee was a female giant panda born around September 1940 in China and settled in Bronx Zoo of New York.

In 1941, Soong May-ling presented two giant pandas, Pan Dee and Pan Dah, to the Bronx Zoo. The gift of the two giant pandas was the inception of China's modern "panda diplomacy" and established the political gift model of "panda diplomacy".

On October 4, 1945, Pan Dee died of peritonitis.

Named
On April 29, 1942, an all-American children's contest to name giant pandas launched by the United States Association for the Relief of Chinese Refugees was announced. The pair of giant pandas were named "Pan Dah" and "Pan Dee".

See also
 Pan Dah
 Panda diplomacy

References

1940 animal births
1945 animal deaths
Individual giant pandas
Individual animals in Japan
Deaths from peritonitis